The Sinking Ships (sometimes referred to as Sinking Ships) was an English post-punk band formed in 1979.

History 
The Sinking Ships was formed in the autumn of 1979 by former members of the bands Berlin and Stress named Simon Brighton (guitarist), Terry Welbourn (bassist), Colin Hopkirk (vocalist), and Nick Green (drummer) in Wragby, Lincolnshire, United Kingdom.

The band recorded two tracks for the local New Wave compilation Household Shocks in 1980; Hopkirk left the band after its release. In the Spring of 1980, it recorded the single The Cinema Clock. After that, the band's members increased from three to six. In 1981, the band's members again decreased to three, and they released their albums Dream and After the Rain - Live in April 1981 on the Recession label. After that, the band's members split up.

In 2018, they released a live EP from 1980 entitled "Playground Studios, Wragby, 1980." It was available on their Bandcamp page for a short period before being removed.

In 2021, the band released a "compilation" album on their Bandcamp entitled "The Cinema Clock ...And Other Stories", featuring a number of their songs from their short career together.

In May 2022, they released "SINKING SHIPS LIVE! - 1981", a compilation album containing live recordings of the band's performances at Carre's Grammar School and the Lincoln College of Art. Later on, in June 2022, the band released Over the Edge and History, two songs they had recorded in 1987 after a brief reunion. The two songs are different from the rest of their discography in that they are more pop-oriented, in contrast to their usual post-punk style of music.

Legacy 
Their most popular song is Strangers, due to the artist being unknown to many people for a while until the song with the band's name was found on YouTube. It was thought to have been made by the same band as The Most Mysterious Song on the Internet because of the singer's voice and the mystery around the two songs. However, the singer of the song was contacted and said that the band did not make the song.

Discography

Albums 
The Cinema Clock ...And Other Stories (2021)
SINKING SHIPS LIVE! - 1981 (2022)

EPs 

 Playground Studios, Wragby, 1980. (live, released in 2018)

Singles 
The Cinema Clock (released in November 1980)
Dream (released in April 1981)
Over the Edge (released in 1987)

References

External links 

 The Sinking Ships on Discogs
 The Sinking Ships on Bandcamp

1979 establishments in the United Kingdom
1981 disestablishments in the United Kingdom
English post-punk music groups